The field of Malayalam writers include the following people, from various disciplines and periods.

Art criticism
Mani Madhava Chakyar (1899–1990)

Poetry

Arnos Paathiri (1681–1732)
Cherusseri Namboothiri
Irayimman Thampi
Kattakayam Cherian Mappillai (1859–1936)
Kerala Varma Valiya Koyithampuran
K. C. Kesava Pillai (1868–1914)
Kunchan Nambiar (1705–1770)
Kumaran Asan (1873–1924)
Kutty Kunju Thankachi
Niranam poets
Poonthanam Namboothiri
Thunchaththu Ezhuthachan
Ulloor S Parameswara Iyer (1877–1949)
Unnayi Warrier
Vallathol Narayana Menon (1878–1958)

Modern Romantics

Bodheswaran
Changampuzha Krishna Pillai (1911–1948)
Edappalli Raghavan Pillai (1909–1936)
M.P.Appan
Pala Narayanan Nair
Pallathu Raman (1892-1950)
P. Kunhiraman Nair (1906–1978)
Vennikkulam Gopala Kurup

Other modern poets

Akkitham
Attoor Ravi Varma
A. Ayyappan
Ayyappa Panicker
Balachandran Chullikkadu
Chandiroor Divakaran
Edasseri
G. Shankara Kurup (1900–1978)
Kadammanitta
Kadathanat Madhavi Amma
Kureepuzha Sreekumar
Lalitha Lenin
V Madhusoodanan Nair
M. Govindan
Mary John Thottam
Nellikkal Muraleedharan
N. V. Krishna Warrier
Olappamanna
O. N. V. Kurup
Punaloor Balan
Satchidanandan
Sugathakumari
Thirunalloor Karunakaran
Vayalar Ramavarma
Vinayachandran
Vishnunarayanan Namboothiri
Vyloppilli (1911–1985)

Post-modern poets

Anvar Ali
A. Ayyappan
A. C. Sreehari
Kalpatta Narayanan
Kureepuzha Sreekumar
Kavitha Balakrishnan
Manoj Kuroor
Mohanakrishnan Kaladi
M.S. Banesh
Rafeeq Ahamed
Rajesh Chithira
P. P. Ramachandran
T. P. Rajeevan
Sathish Kalathil
Satyan Madakkara
S. Joseph
T. P. Rajeevan
V. M. Girija
Veerankutty

Fiction

Early period

Ambadi Narayana Poduval (1871–1936)
Appu Nedungadi (1863–1933)
C. Kunhirama Menon (M. R. K. C.) (1882–1939)
C. S. Gopala Panicker (1872–1940)
C. V. Raman Pillai (1858–1922)
Moorkoth Kumaran (1874–1941)
O. Chandhu Menon (1847–1900)
Vengayil Kunhiraman Nayanar (1860–1914)

Modern

Anand
Ashitha
Basheer (1908–1994)
Benyamin
Chandramathi
C. Radhakrishnan
C. V. Kunhiraman
E. Harikumar
Geetha Hiranyan
George Onakkur
Hassan Thikkodi
Joy J. Kaimaparamban
Kakkanadan (1935–2011)
Karur (1898–1974)
Kovilan
K. Saraswathi Amma (1919–1974)
K. Surendran
Lalithambika Antharjanam (1909–1987)
Madhavikkutti (Kamala Das)
Malayatoor Ramakrishnan (1927–1997)
M. Mukundan
M. P. Narayana Pillai
M. T. Vasudevan Nair
Nandanar
N. S. Madhavan
N. P. Mohammed
O. V. Vijayan (1930–2005)
P. Padmarajan (1945–1991)
Parappurath (K.E. Mathai)
Pattathuvila
P. F. Mathews
P. K. Balakrishnan (1926–1991)
Ponjikkara Rafi
Ponkunnam Varkey (1908–2004)
Kesava Dev (1904–1983)
P. M. Taj (1956–1990)
P. R. Shyamala
Priya A. S.
Sachidanandan
Sajil Sreedhar
Shahina EK

S. K. Pottekkatt (1913–1982)
Subhash Chandran
T. D. Ramakrishnan
Thakazhi Sivasankara Pillai (1914–1999)
T. Padmanabhan
T. V. Kochubava
Uroob (1915–1979)
Vaikom Chandrasekharan Nair
V. J. James
V. K. N. (1932–2004)
V. P. Sivakumar
Zacharia

Post-modern fiction

Anoop Sasikumar
G. R. Indugopan
Pradeep
S. Hareesh
Socrates K. Valath

Playwrights 

C. J. Thomas
C. L. Jose
C. N. Sreekantan Nair
G. Sankara Pillai
Kainikkara Kumara Pillai
Kainikkara Padmanabha Pillai
S. L. Puram Sadanandan
Thikkodiyan
Thoppil Bhasi
T. N. Gopinathan Nair

Children's literature

P. Narendranath
Shebaly
Sippy Pallippuram
Sumangala

Essayists

Annie Thayyil
C. N. Ahmad Moulavi
K. M. George
Puthezhath Raman Menon
R. Narayana Panickar
Sanjayan
S. Guptan Nair
Sabeena Rafi
Sooranad Kunjan Pillai
Sukumar Azhikode
T. M. Chummar
V. V. K. Valath

Literary criticism

K.Damodaran (1912–1976)
Kesari Balakrishna Pillai (1889–1960)
K. M. Daniel (1920–1988)
K. P. Appan (1936–2008)
Kuttikrishna Marar (1900–1973)
Kuttipuzha Krishna Pillai
M. Achuthan (1930–2017)
M. Krishnan Nair
M. K. Sanu
M. Leelavathy
M. N. Vijayan (1930–2007)
M. P. Paul (1904–1952)
M.R. Chandrasekharan
Mundasseri (1901–1977)
Narendra Prasad (1946–2003)
P. K. Narayana Pillai
S. Guptan Nair (1919–2006)
S. Rajasekharan
Sukumar Azhikode (1926–2012)
V. C. Sreejan
P. K. Rajasekharan

Film criticism

C. S. Venkiteswaran
Kozhikodan
Vijayakrishnan

Translation

Leela Devi
M. K. Kumaran
M. N. Sathyaardhi
Nileena Abraham
N. K. Damodaran
V. Unnikrishnan Nair

Others

Hermann Gundert
Jyesthadevan
Kottarathil Sankunni
Krishna Chaithanya

See also
 Malayalam literature

References

Malayalam

authors by category
Malayalam